The Never Miss a Super Bowl Club (or the NMASB Club) is a group of football fans (outside of owners and staff) who have gone to every Super Bowl since 1967. Visa popularized the original group of four in a commercial that aired in 2010. Since then, two members have died and one has been retroactively added, bringing the total to three surviving fans—Don Crisam, Tom Henschel, and Gregory Eaten—who most recently attended Super Bowl LVII in 2023.

History
The club was first popularized by Visa as part of an advertising campaign called Go Fans. The commercial was narrated by Morgan Freeman. Surveys have shown that most respondents would be willing to miss or postpone major events in their life, including the birth of their child or a wedding date, to see the Super Bowl. As a result, Visa came up with an advertising campaign to feature four men who have attended every Super Bowl since the first one in 1967. The four men were New England Patriots fan Don Crisman, San Francisco 49ers fan Larry Jacobson, Pittsburgh Steelers fan Thomas Henschel, and Green Bay Packers fan Robert Cook. The commercial itself featured the four men holding up tickets for 44 years of Super Bowls.

In early February 2011, it was announced that 79-year-old Robert Cook would be unable to attend Super Bowl XLV after being hospitalized in Wisconsin. His daughters were expected to attend the game in his place. He died a few days later.

At Super Bowl LI, in February 2017, another person who had gone to every Super Bowl game, Gregory Eaton, met the three remaining members and officially joined the club.

In October 2017, member Larry Jacobson, 78, of San Francisco, CA died, reducing the club to three remaining members.

Lifetime tickets promotion
A promotion was also run during the 2010 commercial. The Super Bowl Trip for Life Sweepstakes stated that anyone who used their Visa card between September 9 and December 31, 2010, would be entered to win a chance to see the Super Bowl for life. Winners would receive round-trip airfare, accommodations, and tickets to the Super Bowl. In 2011, it was announced that Tyler Weber, then 24 years old, won the contest.

Owner and staff attendees

Outside of the group of fans, groundskeeper George Toma has assisted in preparing the field for every Super Bowl.

Norma Hunt, the widow of Kansas City Chiefs founding owner Lamar Hunt has attended every Super Bowl game. Lamar Hunt helped establish the championship game and gave it its namesake.

Photojournalist John Biever has attended every Super Bowl.

Sports journalist Jerry Green attended every Super Bowl until choosing to not go to Super Bowl LVII due to declining health.

References

Super Bowl commercials
Sports organizations established in 1967
Sports fandom
Visa Inc.